Trapped is an Australian children's television series which first premiered on 30 November 2008 and finished its first run on 18 April 2009 on the Seven Network. The 26-part series was shot entirely on location in and around Broome, Western Australia from May to October 2008. A follow up series entitled Castaway began airing on the Seven Network on 12 February 2011. Many of the actors in the main cast of Trapped reprised their roles.

Premise
Following the mysterious disappearance of their parents from a remote scientific research station, a group of children are trapped in a dangerous paradise.
They can only rely on their own resources to survive, find out what's happened to their parents and uncover the terrible secret that is behind the Enterprise Project. Many challenges, mysteries and problems are faced. It's their job to work this all out.

Cast

Main
Marcel Bracks as Rob Frazer
Benjamin Jay as Ryan Cavaner
Maia Mitchell as Natasha Hamilton
Anthony Spanos as Josh Jacobs
Mikayla Southgate as Jarrah Haddon
Sam Fraser as Suzuki Haddon
Natasha Phillips as Lily Taylor
Matilda Terbio as Emma Taylor
Kim Walsh as Maggie Monks
Brad Albert as Gabe

Episodes

See also
Castaway (TV series)
List of Australian television series

References

External links

Trapped on Facebook

Australian children's television series
Seven Network original programming
2008 Australian television series debuts
2009 Australian television series endings
Television shows set in Western Australia
Television series about children